Charles Bury may refer to:

Charles Bury, 1st Earl of Charleville (1764–1835), Irish politician
Charles Bury, 2nd Earl of Charleville (1801–1851), Irish politician, son of the above
Charles Howard-Bury (1883–1963), British explorer and politician, great-grandson of the above
Charles Rugeley Bury (1890–1968), English chemist, see Transition metal

See also
Charles Berry (disambiguation)